Piarco International Airport  is an international airport serving the island of Trinidad and is one of two international airports in Trinidad and Tobago. The airport is the primary hub and operating base for the country's national airline, as well as the Caribbean's largest airline, Caribbean Airlines.

Piarco International Airport has direct scheduled service to destinations in the United States, Canada, Central America, South America and Europe. It is also a significant transit hub for the Southern Caribbean and serves as the primary connection point for many passengers travelling from Guyana.

History
The Piarco Airport opened on 8 January 1931, to serve Venezuela's Compagnie Generale Aeropostale. Before this, the Queen's Park Savannah, the Mucurapo Field, and the Cocorite Docks (for flying boats) were used as airstrips to serve the island.

In World War II the original airfield was used by the Royal Navy for the Fleet Air Arm No. 1 Observer Training School with the base known as RNAS Piarco (HMS Goshawk). The following squadrons were based there until disbanding in 1945:

749 Naval Air Squadron (Observer Training Squadron), 1 January 1941 - 1 October 1945
750 Naval Air Squadron (Observer Training Squadron), 5 November 1940 - 10 October 1945
752 Naval Air Squadron (Observer Training Squadron), 5 November 1940 - 9 November 1945
793 Naval Air Squadron (Air Towed Target Unit), 18 November 1940 - 10 October 1945
817 Naval Air Squadron (Torpedo, Spotter, Reconnaissance Squadron), 'Z' flight, 21 September 1943 - 27 September 1943.

In 1942 it was also used by both the United States Army Air Forces Sixth Air Force and United States Navy air squadrons. The airport was used both as a transport airfield and also for anti submarine patrol flights over the south Caribbean. It was returned to civil control after the war ended.

In World War II the United States Army Air Forces Sixth Air Force stationed the following units at the airport performing anti submarine patrols:
1st Bombardment Squadron (9th Bombardment Group) 24 April29 October 1941 (B-18 Bolo)
10th Bombardment Squadron (25th Bombardment Group) 27 August12 October 1943 (B-18 Bolo)
35th Bombardment Squadron (25th Bombardment Group) 27 August12 October 1943 (B-18 Bolo)

Modern day
A major expansion of the airport, which included the construction of a new terminal building, and high-speed taxiways, was completed in 2001. The old airport building is currently used for cargo handling. Piarco International Airport is also the primary hub and operating base of Caribbean Airlines and was also the primary hub and operating base of the now defunct BWIA West Indies Airways and Air Caribbean. Briko Air Services And Aerial World Services operate a flight school at the airport.

In 2006 the Airports Authority of Trinidad And Tobago commissioned a study for land use planning and urban development planning. All-Inclusive Project Development Services Limited was commissioned to conduct the study. The study was completed in October 2007 and approved by the Board. In 2011, work on the infrastructure of the North Aviation Business Park began. It is completed in 2013.

In December 2019, the European Union awarded the Airports Authority of Trinidad and Tobago a grant of 1.5 million euros to finance the installation of a large-scale solar panel system at the Piarco International Airport, where ground-mounted solar panels will be installed with an annual generation capacity of 1,443,830 kWh and potentially avoid 1,010 metric tons of   emissions annually.

In 2021, 2022, and 2023 Piarco International Airport was rated the best airport in the Caribbean by Skytrax; winning the honor over 3 consecutive years.  

In 2021,it was also named third best in the Caribbean and Latin American Regions.

Facilities

Operational Facilities 
At Piarco International Airport there are two high-speed taxiways and three connector taxiways (ICAO Code F for new large aircraft). This technologically state of the art airport has 82 ticket counter positions that operate under SITA's fibre-optic C.U.T.E. system which exceeds the recommended standards of ICAO and IATA. It also has a Flight Information Display System, which serves all airport users and a Baggage Information Display System.

The terminal is a fully air-conditioned, smoke-free building, equipped to handle peak-hour passenger traffic of 1,500 processing passengers through a fully computerised immigration system. The Customs Hall has four baggage/cargo carousels.

An administrative/operations building for the Trinidad and Tobago Air Guard is being constructed at the Piarco Air Base. Also, a military airfield will be constructed near the air base.

The control tower at the old terminal building is currently used for air traffic control. The tower at the new terminal building is used for ramp control and runway movement control. A new nine-story control tower was opened in 2011.

The overall layout of the building consists of three main elements: a landside core structure, a single-level duty-free shopping mall, and a 2-level 'Y' shaped concourse.  cathedral ceilings and glass walls provide passengers and other visitors to the North Terminal with a sense of open space and magnificent views of the Piarco savannah and the nearby Northern Range mountains. 

The airport is also large enough to accommodate most international widebody airliners including the Boeing 747, Airbus A330-300, Boeing 777, Boeing 767 and the Airbus A340. Piarco International is capable of medium-sized aircraft including the Boeing 737, Boeing 757, Airbus A320, Embraer 190 as well as small aircraft such as the DeHavilland Dash 8, ATR 72 and other such turboprop aircraft. The airport layout consists of one main terminal building which includes three concourses. These concourses are not strictly identified as their name depicts but are divided into the following areas; Gates 1–7, Gates 8–14, and gates 8-14 specifically serve Caribbean Airlines  and the Tobago concourse which serves flights to Tobago.

The Air Guard of Trinidad and Tobago is based at Piarco International Airport. During the existence of BWIA West Indies, its head office was on the airport property.

The disused south terminal has been renovated into a VIP terminal for the Summit of The Americas. The North terminal has also received additional remote parking stands. In November 2009, upgrades on the south terminal were completed and the area now serves as a private/executive jet facility for high-end travellers.

In 2022, the sod was turned for a $12M solar park at the airport.

Terminals 
Piarco International Airport has two terminals. The south terminal was once the passenger terminal for the airport but has been renovated to serve as an executive terminal. It serves cargo flights, general aviation and helicopter flights. It has fourteen parking positions as well as light aircraft parking. In addition it has the Airports Administration Centre, the head office of the Airports Authority of Trinidad and Tobago. The North terminal is the main passenger terminal. It handles all the commercial passenger airline traffic. The north terminal has twenty-nine parking positions.

In addition to passenger airlines, the airport also handles cargo traffic, general aviation, military and helicopter flights to the many oil rigs present offshore.

North Terminal 
The North Terminal is the main passenger terminal built in 2001, handling all commercial passenger airline traffic. It has a total of fourteen jetway gates spread among two concourses, with a total of twenty-nine parking positions spread among the three concourses. The concourses are not strictly named, but are split among Caribbean Airlines and all other airlines. Gates 1-7 form the western concourse serving all international airlines. It contains 1 VIP lounge and is connected to the rest of the airport via the joint southern atrium. Gates 8-14 form the eastern concourse serving all international Caribbean Airlines flights. It contains the Club Caribbean lounge. Both concourses contain shopping and restaurants both in-concourse and in the joint atrium area. Both concourses are served by 1 security checkpoint located in the atrium outside the western concourse.

The two concourses together form the international departures section of the airport, with a duty free mall area and panoramic views of the airfield and the Northern Range. The rest of the North Terminal consists of the check-in hall, public atrium, arrivals hall, local food court and the Tobago concourse, located just outside the check-in hall. The Tobago concourse strictly serves domestic flights to Tobago and as such does not require the same infrastructure as an international departure hall. The check-in hall contains 82 ticket counter positions, where Caribbean Airlines occupies the eastern extreme desks and the western extreme desks (designated for Tobago), and all other airlines occupy the remaining counters. The arrivals hall has 4 baggage claim belts, rental car facilities and restaurants. It is connected to the public atrium just as the check-in hall. The public atrium itself is a social space consisting of fast food, shopping and seating underneath the largest glass dome in the Caribbean. It connects the international departures hall, Tobago concourse, arrivals hall and check-in hall.

In total, the airport has twenty-nine parking positions laid out as follows: fourteen jetway parking positions spread among the international departures hall, three parking positions at the Tobago concourse, eight remote stands at the eastern end and four remote stands at the western end.

South Terminal 
The south terminal now serves general aviation, cargo and helicopter flights. It has a total of fourteen parking positions as well as offices for the Airport Administration Centre and the Airports Authority of Trinidad and Tobago.

Ground Transportation 
The airport is served by the east-west Churchill-Roosevelt Highway which runs to the north of the airport, and connects to the airport circular via BWIA Boulevard. The airport is also accessible from the south via the Caroni South Bank Road, which connects to the north-south Uriah Butler Highway at Caroni. 

The Public Transport Service Corporation runs an hourly service during the week providing a bus connection between the airport and City Gate, Port of Spain. From City Gate, passengers can transit onto a bus to their final destination. Privately run taxi services are also available at the airport with fixed fares. 

Rental car services are also available at the airport's curbside arrivals hall, from both local and foreign rental companies. The airport contains a large ground-level car park with fixed daily, weekly and monthly fares, as well as secondary parking north of the existing car park on an unfinished roadway, to which shuttle services are provided.

Expansion 
The Airport underwent expansion and renovation works in preparation for the Commonwealth Heads of Government summit in November 2009. These improvements included:
Repaving and repainting of the taxiways.
Re-painting of the runway.
Installation of new Taxiway and runway lighting.
More recently, numerous upgrades have been conducted at the airport, and more are planned. These include:

 Redone Club Caribbean lounge in the eastern concourse.
 Redone passport check area.
 Upgrades to atrium seating facilities
 Planned Four Points by Sheraton hotel

Airlines and destinations

Passenger

The following airlines operate regular scheduled and charter flights to and from Trinidad:

Cargo

Accidents and incidents

 22 August 1942 – a Lockheed Model 14 Super Electra operated by KLM West-Indisch Bedrijf crashed shortly after takeoff, about 2 miles from the airport, killing all 13 people on board.
5 January 1963 – A Cessna Skywagon carrying two Swedish persons, Torgny Sommelius (Pilot) and actor Erik Strandmark, crash landed and caught fire at Piarco, killing them.
28 November 1963 – a Convair CV-340 operated by Avensa was hijacked by six armed people shortly after taking off from Ciudad Bolívar, with the destination of Caracas. They forced the pilot to circle Ciudad Bolívar and ordered them to droppamphlets urging the Venezuelan public to avoid voting in the upcoming elections. After that they demanded to be flown to Piarco, where they surrendered.
 29 July 1984 –  An Aeropostal DC-9 flight from Caracas to Curaçao with 87 persons on board was hijacked in the air by 5 gunmen and forced to land at Piarco. The Trinidad and Tobago Government refused to negotiate with the hijackers and the aircraft departed hours later. 36 hours later, Venezuelan counter-terrorist troops stormed the plane and rescued the hostages with two of the hijackers killed during gunfire.
 17 January 1990 – A male American tourist stripped himself, jumped a fence that led into the airport tarmac, then stole a car and crashed it into a British Airways Boeing 747. After that he threw himself into the engine of the plane, resulting in his death.
 18 April 2005 – Tobago Express Dash 8–300 made an emergency landing after the nose wheel section of the landing gear failed to deploy with multiple attempts. There were no deaths reported among the 46 passengers and 3 crew members, although some had panic attacks.
 October 2007 – Both Piarco and what was then known as the Crown Point International Airport (now the Arthur Napoleon Raymond Robinson International Airport) were shut down for at least 2 days due to failed negotiations with the airport staff for better working wages. All flights operated through Piarco and Crown Point were cancelled, severely disrupting passengers travelling to Caribbean and International destinations.
 2007 – A Caribbean Airlines flight from Norman Manley International Airport with stops at Grantley Adams International Airport in Barbados and the Princess Juliana International Airport in Sint Maarten encountered smoke in the engine of a Boeing 737–800 upon arrival in Piarco. Auxiliary power was lost in the cabin, but there were no reports on injuries of the 84 passengers.
 15 August 2008 – An American Airlines Boeing 757–200 made an emergency landing after hydraulic system problems. The aircraft landed safely but the brakes locked up and the plane could not exit the runway. Passengers were ferried to the terminal and mechanics took some three hours to remove the aircraft, closing the airport to flight operations. No injuries were reported among the 188 passengers and seven-member crew.
 2009 – Piarco and Crown Point International Airports suffered massive delays and cancellations after aircraft fuel plagued with massive amounts of sulphur was discovered, rendering the fuel unusable. Airlines to and from Piarco and Crown Point either cancelled or delayed their flights.
14 July 2010 – An American Airlines Boeing 767–300 operating flight 1668 to Miami International was forced to make an emergency landing at the field following a bird strike. No Injuries or deaths were reported among the 212 passengers and crew.
12 August 2011 – A North American Airlines plane was on approach near the Airport just after 2pm when the pilots reported smoke coming from the cockpit. The aircraft managed to land safely at the airport with no injuries.
19 October 2021 - An Aerial World Services Ltd Diamond DA40 Diamond Star crashed under unknown circumstances near Piarco while approaching the airport. Both occupants (a flight instructor and flight student) were injured.

Awards
2006 – The "Caribbean's Leading Airport", by the World Travel Awards

See also
List of the busiest airports in the Caribbean

References

External links 
 Official website
 Airports Authority of Trinidad and Tobago
 

1931 establishments in Trinidad and Tobago
Airfields of the United States Army Air Forces in the Caribbean, Central, and South America
Airports established in 1931
Airports in Trinidad and Tobago
Trinidad (island)